Luthrie railway station served the village of Luthrie, Fife, Scotland from 1909 to 1951 on the Newburgh and North Fife Railway.

History 
The station was opened on 25 January 1909 by the Newburgh and North Fife Railway.

To the west was the goods yard. The signal box closed in 1928 and was replaced by a ground frame, allowing access to the goods yard. The station was host to a LNER camping coach from 1935 to 1938.

The line and station closed to passengers on 12 February 1951. The line closed to goods traffic on 5 October 1964.

References 

Disused railway stations in Fife
Railway stations in Great Britain opened in 1909
Railway stations in Great Britain closed in 1951
Former North British Railway stations
1909 establishments in Scotland
1951 disestablishments in Scotland